Kitshoff is a surname. Notable people with the surname include:

Hanno Kitshoff (born 1984), South African rugby union player
Rohan Kitshoff (born 1985), Namibian rugby union player
Steven Kitshoff (born 1992), South African rugby union player